Kilroy Bluff is an ice-covered bluff,  high, on the west side of Nursery Glacier at the junction with Jorda Glacier in the Churchill Mountains of Antarctica. The east face of the feature is indented by twin cirques that resemble eyes. Under certain light conditions the appearance of the bluff is reminiscent of the ubiquitous graffiti of World War II: a caricature of a head peering over a wall and the message "Kilroy was here".

References

Cliffs of Oates Land